Reichl is a surname, a variant spelling of Reichel.
People with this surname include:
Fritz Reichl (1890–1959), Austrian architect
Linda Reichl (born 1942), American physicist
Michal Reichl (born 1992), Czech footballer
Ruth Reichl (born 1948), American chef and food writer
Sebastian Reichl, guitarist for German metal band Deadlock (band)
Udo Reichl (born 1959), German bioengineer

Surnames from given names